David Michaels may refer to:
David Michaels (author), a pseudonym for the authors of novels in the Splinter Cell, EndWar, H.A.W.X, and Ghost Recon series
David Michaels (epidemiologist) (born 1954), American epidemiologist and OSHA official
David Michaels (actor) (born 1964), English actor
Dave Michaels (musician) (born 1944), co-founder of the 1960s acid rock band H. P. Lovecraft